Beijing Huijia Private School is a private school in Changping District, Beijing, China. It serves primary school to senior high school and uses International Baccalaureate. As of 2010 it was the only Beijing private school serving Mainland Chinese students which offered IB. As of that year Zhao Wenxiu was the executive principal. In a 2016 ranking of Chinese high schools that send students to study in American universities, Beijing Huijia Private School ranked number 11 in mainland China in terms of the number of students entering top American universities.

It opened in 1993. By 2010 it received permission to accept non-Mainland Chinese students. As of that year 20% of its students were foreigners.

In 2015 the tuition for the year was 220,000 renminbi ($35,442 U.S. dollars). China Daily ranked Huijia Private School as the 5th most expensive private school in Beijing.

References

External links
 Beijing Huijia Private School
 Beijing Huijia Private School 

Private schools in Beijing
International Baccalaureate schools in China
1993 establishments in China
Educational institutions established in 1993